Unión Deportiva Maracena is a Spanish football team based in Maracena, in the autonomous community of Andalusia. Founded in 1945, it currently plays in Tercera División – Group 9, holding home matches at Ciudad Deportiva de Maracena, with a 2,000-seat capacity.

Season to season

26 seasons in Tercera División
1 season in Tercera Federación

Former players
 Pedro Rómoli
 Enrique

References

External links
Futbolme team profile 

Football clubs in Andalusia
Association football clubs established in 1945
1945 establishments in Spain
Province of Granada